is a Japanese football player.

Club statistics

References

External links

1985 births
Living people
Association football people from Kyoto Prefecture
Japanese footballers
J1 League players
J2 League players
Japan Football League players
Cerezo Osaka players
Sagan Tosu players
V-Varen Nagasaki players
Zweigen Kanazawa players
Japan Soccer College players
Association football midfielders